Hartley Township may refer to:

Hartley Township, O'Brien County, Iowa
Hartley Township, Union County, Pennsylvania

See also
Hartley (disambiguation)